Babbitt is a 1924 American silent drama film directed by Harry Beaumont and starring Willard Louis, Mary Alden, and Carmel Myers. It is based on the 1922 novel of the same title by Sinclair Lewis, later also adapted into a 1934 sound film.

Cast

Preservation
With no prints of Babbitt located in any film archives, it is a lost film.

References

Bibliography
 Robert B. Connelly. The Silents: Silent Feature Films, 1910-36, Volume 40, Issue 2. December Press, 1998.

External links

Stills at silenthollywood.com

1924 films
1924 drama films
1920s English-language films
American silent feature films
Silent American drama films
American black-and-white films
Films directed by Harry Beaumont
Warner Bros. films
Lost American films
1924 lost films
Lost drama films
1920s American films